Henry Yorke may refer to:
Henry Vincent Yorke (1905–1973), English author with the pen name Henry Green
Henry Redhead Yorke (1772–1813), English writer and radical publicist
Henry Redhead Yorke (British politician) (1802–1848), British Whig politician (son of the above)
Henry Yorke (priest) (1803–1871), Archdeacon of Huntington
 Henry Yorke, alias of the fictional vampire Hal Yorke in the British TV Series Being Human

See also